Tommy Lane (December 17, 1937 – November 29, 2021) 
was an American actor and stunt performer known for his appearances on television and in films of the 1970s, including Shaft (1971), Shamus (1973) and Live and Let Die (1973). In Shaft and Live and Let Die, he wore a tweed jacket. He also performed stunts in several movies.

Biography 
He was born as Tommy Lee Jones in 1937.

Career 
His career started when he appeared in several episodes of NBC series Flipper in mid-1960s.

He was best remembered by roles in Shaft and Live and Let Die. In Shaft he played a gangster named Leroy, employed by Harlem crime boss Bumpy who attacks the title character, only to be defeated and flung through a window.

His Live and Let Die role as Adam earned the character 90th place in a group of 104 James Bond villains as rated by Esquire. Adam, one of Kananga's henchmen, participates in two attempts to assassinate Bond, eludes Sheriff J.W. Pepper, then orders a boat chase and becomes the last pursuer. He then says the famous line:“You made one mistake back on that island, Bond. You took something that didn’t belong to you. And you took it from a friend of Mr. Big’s.” Lane's character was also notable for his snappy style of dressing  — he wore a tweed suit for much of the film.

He played a guy known as 44 in Ossie Davis’ Cotton Comes to Harlem and also appeared in such films as Ganja & Hess, Shamus with Burt Reynolds and Eureka (1983). On TV, he appeared in 1980s series Simon & Simon.

Music
Lane also had a career as a jazz musician in the eighties. He played trumpet and flugelhorn at New York City's Blue Note.

Death
He died on November 29, 2021 at after a long battle with chronic obstructive pulmonary disease. His survivors include wife Raquel Bastias-Lane, seven children and a stepson and grandchildren and great-grandchildren.

References

External links

 

1937 births
2021 deaths
20th-century American male actors
American stunt performers
African-American actors
American male film actors
American male television actors